Admiral Colpoys was a vessel built in South America in 1792 that the British captured circa 1800. Her new name refers to Admiral John Colpoys. She first traded between London and the Caribbean. Between 1802 and 1807 she made three voyages as a slave ship in the triangular trade in enslaved people. After the abolition of the British slave trade in 1807 she became a merchant vessel. Then in 1813 new owners turned her towards seal hunting. She made four complete voyages to South Georgia before she was wrecked in 1817 during her fifth seal hunting voyage.

Merchantman
Admiral Colpoys first appears in Lloyd's Register for 1801 with Disney, master, Atkins & Co. as owners, and London-Bermuda as trade. The same entry shows her master as changing to G. Musson, and her trade to London-Jamaica. Lloyd's Register for 1802 continues to show Musson and Jamaica.

Enslaving
Owners Thomas King & Co. deployed Admiral Colpoys on three enslaving voyages. For each of her voyages Admiral Colpoys went to the Gold Coast to gather her human cargo.

1st enslaving voyage (1802): under George Adams, master, she left London on 17 November 1800. She delivered the enslaved people to Havana in September 1802. She had embarked 319 captives and landed 287, for a loss rate of 10%. She arrived back at Portsmouth on 22 December from Havana after a voyage of five weeks and three days.

2nd enslaving voyage (1805): under Henry Coley, master, Admiral Colpoys left London on 2 October 1804, bound for the Gold Coast. She started acquiring captives at Cape Coast Castle and then Accra, beginning on 7 February 1805. She delivered the slaves to Demerara on 10 June. She had embarked 337 captives and landed 303, for a loss rate of 10.1%. She left Demerara on 26 July and arrived back at London on 30 September.

3rd enslaving voyage (1807): on 20 January 1807 Richard Coaley received a letter of marque for Admiral Colpoys. She sailed from London on 9 February 1807, bound for the Gold Coast. She acquired captives at Cape Coast Castle, Lagos, and Tantumquerry. She arrived at Demerara on 30 September. She had embarked 326 captives and she landed on 293, for a loss rate of 10.1%.

The Essequebo and Demarary Royal Gazette for 3 October 1807 had two items concerning Admiral Colpoys.
"The Subscribers inform their Friends who Commissioned them to Purchase Negroes in Barbados, that they have received by the Ship Admiral Colpoys, Capt. Coley, 200 Very Prime Gold-Coast Slaves, which they will be ready to deliver on Saturday the 10th of October, at 12 o'Clock. William King & Co., Cumingsburg, 30th September 1807."
"The Subscribers beg leave to inform such of their Friends as Commissioned them to import Negroes, that they have just received 90 Prime Young Gold-Coast Slaves, being part of the Cargo of the Ship Admiral Colpoys from cape coast, last from Barbados, which will be ready for delivery on Saturday the 10th Instant, at the Store of John Madden, Esq. Colin Macrae, & Underwood, Johnson & Co.. Demerary, 3d October 1807."

Admiral Colpoys arrived back at London 24 April 1808.

Merchantman
In 1807 the British Parliament passed an Act for the abolition of the slave trade. However this act merely imposed fines that were insufficient to deter entrepreneurs from engaging in such a profitable business.  A number of Liverpool slave traders continued the trade via various subterfuges (see, for example, the case of Donna Marianna).

Lloyd's Register for 1808 still shows Admiral Colpoys with R. Cooly, master, King & Co., owners, and trade London-Africa. So does Lloyd's Register for 1809; it also shows a new master, Venables, replacing Cooly. However, Lloyd's Register was only as accurate as the owners of the vessels chose to make it by updating their information. It is therefore not clear whether Thomas King & Co. continued enslaving or not. Given that she retained her name and all subsequent merchant voyages had her sailing to British Guiana, she most probably did not.

Lloyd's Register for 1810 shows Admiral Colpoys with Venables, master, King & Co., owners, and trade London-Demerara.

The Slave Trade Felony Act 1811 was passed to stiffen the legal sanctions against those engaged in the slave trade. Transgression became a felony with a punishment that could involve imprisonment or transportation.

Seal hunting
Lloyd's Register for 1813 continues the entries from 1810, but shows a new master, Toderage, replacing Venables. Toderage appears to be a misspelling for Todrig. All of Admiral Colpoyss sealing voyages saw her sailing to South Georgia while under the command of James Todrig, and under the ownership of "Todrig", or James and Francis Todrig.

On her first whaling voyage, Admiral Colpoys left England on 2 July 1813, and returned on 31 May 1814.

On her second, she left on 21 July 1814, and returned on 9 May 1815.

On her third, she left in 1815, and returned on 23 March 1816 with 400 casks and 12 skins (presumably seal).

On her fourth voyage, she left in 1816 and returned on 27 January 1817.

Fate
On her fifth whaling voyage, Admiral Colpoys sailed to South Georgia via Santiago, Cape Verde. She was lost on 28 November 1817 when an iceberg floated into the bay in which she was anchored and pushed her onshore. Her crew was saved.

The crew was able to save 700 barrels of elephant oil that were transhipped to England. However, 800 barrels of elephant oil were lost. Another account reports that the iceberg severed Admiral Colpoyss cable; attempts to break up the iceberg using cannon fire were unable to prevent Admiral Colpoys from drifting on to the rocks. Francis Todrig, in King George, retrieved the crew.

Notes

Citations

References
 

 
  
 
 

1792 ships
Captured ships
Age of Sail merchant ships
Merchant ships of the United Kingdom
London slave ships
Sealing ships
Seal hunting
Maritime incidents in 1817